Joachim III may refer to:

 Joachim III Frederick, Elector of Brandenburg (1546–1608)
 Patriarch Joachim III of Constantinople (1834–1912)
 Joachim III of Bulgaria, Patriarch of Bulgarian Orthodox Church 1282 - 1300